Stephen Watson (born 4 April 1973 in Liverpool) is an English former professional footballer who played for and captained Scottish side St Mirren in the early 1990s.

Career
Watson began his career with Rangers, making three league appearances in the 1992–93 season. He moved on to St Mirren and spent four years with the Paisley club. Watson then spent a spell in Hong Kong with Yee Hope from 1999–2001 before returning to Scotland to play with Falkirk and Partick Thistle.

References

External links
Player profile
Soccerbase profile

Rangers F.C. players
Troon F.C. players
St Mirren F.C. players
Partick Thistle F.C. players
Falkirk F.C. players
Scottish Football League players
English footballers
1973 births
Footballers from Liverpool
Living people
Expatriate footballers in Hong Kong
Association football midfielders
English expatriate sportspeople in Hong Kong
English expatriate footballers